Keropok lekor is a traditional Malay fish cracker snack originating from the state of Terengganu, Malaysia. It is made from fish and sago flour and seasoned with salt and sugar. It is slightly greyish in colour and gives off a fishy taste and smell which becomes more prominent as it cools down after frying. The word lekor is said to be derived from a Terengganu Malay word meaning "to roll".

It is usually made by grinding fish or vegetables into a paste, mixing it with sago and then deep-frying it. It comes in three main forms: lekor (long and chewy), rebus (steamed) and keping (thin and crispy).

There are two types of keropok lekor which are the keropok lekor goreng and keropok lekor rebus - the former are shaped like sausages with a chewy texture and fried whereas the latter is boiled. Keropok lekor should not be confused with keropok keping. 

The snack is eaten with special homemade chili blends that are particular to Terengganu and sold there; though modern innovations like adding mayonnaise and cheese sauce (the combination known locally as "keropok cheese") may also be available.

Gallery

References 

Malaysian snack foods